Bernterode is a village and a former municipality in the district of Eichsfeld, Thuringia, Germany. Since 1 September 2009, it is part of the town Breitenworbis.

Former municipalities in Thuringia